Ornithogalum adseptentrionesvergentulum is a species of flowering plant in the family Asparagaceae, native to the Cape Provinces of South Africa. The specific epithet means "inclined towards the north".

References

adseptentrionesvergentulum
Endemic flora of South Africa
Flora of the Cape Provinces
Plants described in 1996